WSCP-LP (channel 13), branded on-air as Pennsylvania Channel 13, was a low-powered independent television station licensed to Bellefonte, Pennsylvania, United States, which served the State College area. The station was owned by Pathway Community Radio, Inc. WSCP-LP's transmitter was located southwest of State College on the Pine Grove Mills Mountain.

History
The station first began its broadcasting operations in 1990 as W13BY under the original ownership of George W. Kimble, however W13BY was first licensed as a station or had a construction permit on November 30, 1988. At first, it was an affiliate of The Box music video network, and later a translator station of Johnstown NBC affiliate WJAC-TV (Channel 6).

In 2005, the station was purchased by Pathway Community Radio, which retransmitted Pittsburgh's WPCB-TV/Cornerstone Television (via Altoona satellite WKBS-TV) temporarily in a transition period until the station began their own programming schedule.

In 2005, the station became a Class A operation. On May 5, 2008, the station changed its call sign to WSCP-CA. On June 25, 2010, the Federal Communications Commission (FCC) changed the WSCP-CA calls to DWSCP-CA possibly that the WSCP-CA broadcast license was going to be deleted. About two months later on August 5, 2010, the FCC restored the WSCP-CA call sign. On May 3, 2011, the station requested a change from class A to low-power status, and the station's call sign was changed to WSCP-LP.

References

External links
 Archived version of station website

SCP-LP
Television channels and stations established in 1990
1990 establishments in Pennsylvania
Defunct television stations in the United States
SCP-LP
Television channels and stations disestablished in 2015
2015 disestablishments in Pennsylvania